Skilfonna ("The Divide Glacier") is a glacier in Sørkapp Land at Spitsbergen, Svalbard. It is located west of Russefjella, and separates the glacier of Hedgehogfonna from Vasil'evbreen. The mountains of Brendetoppane separate Skilfonna from Svalisbreen.

References

Glaciers of Spitsbergen